"Baby Don't Cry" is a song recorded by Canadian country music group One Horse Blue. It was released in 1994 as the fifth single from their fifth studio album, One Horse Blue (1993). It peaked at number 6 on the RPM Country Tracks chart in May 1994.

Chart performance

Year-end charts

References

1993 songs
1994 singles
One Horse Blue songs